Ağören is a village in the Tercan District, Erzincan Province, Turkey. The village is populated by Kurds of the Kimsor tribe and had a population of 29 in 2021.

References 

Villages in Tercan District
Kurdish settlements in Erzincan Province